Traveler's Coffee is a Russian coffee shop chain based in Novosibirsk in 1997 (or 2000) by American entrepreneur Christopher Michael Tara-Browne. The chain's coffee shops operate in Russia, Kazakhstan, Ukraine, Azerbaijan and Germany.

History
The coffee chain was founded in Novosibirsk in 1997 by the executive director of the New York Pizza Christopher Michael Tara-Browne and his wife Svetlana.

In 2001, the first separate cafe of the chain was opened on Krasny Prospekt 86b near the Gagarinskaya Metro Station. In the same year a roasting facility was established in Koltsovo, Novosibirsk Oblast.

In 2007, another cafe of the company was opened, it occupied the spacious premises of the former Zolotoy Koloss Store (Lenin Street 6).

Corporate conflict

Gallery

References

External links
 Traveler's Coffee. Forbes.

Companies based in Novosibirsk
Food and drink companies established in 1997
Coffeehouses and cafés in Russia
Coffee brands